Thorn Lake is a lake in the U.S. state of Wisconsin.

Thorn Lake was named after Alex Thorn, an early settler.

References

Lakes of Wisconsin
Bodies of water of Portage County, Wisconsin